Ashiaa la toshtra (lit. “Things Not to Buy”) is an Egyptian film released in 1970. It was written by Amin Youssef Ghorab, directed by Ahmed Diaa Eddine, and produced by the Egyptian General Film Organization. The film stars Nour El-Sherif, Shams al-Baroudi, and Yehia Chahine.

Synopsis
A rich mayor marries a vivacious woman in Cairo and visits her weekly. His daughter Samira, meanwhile, is in love with her cousin Youssef. The mayor’s wife falls in love with Samira’s music teacher Mahmoud, who comes to her house regularly when Samira does. The mayor’s wife begins spending his money on Mahmoud and leaves him bankrupt, prompting Samira to expose the truth.

Cast
 Yehia Chahine
 Shams al-Baroudi
 Nour El-Sherif
 Nahed Gabr
 Abu Bakr Ezzat
 Soheir El-Barouni
 Ibrahim Emara
 Adel Al-Muhalimi
 Mohamed El-Touni
 Mahmoud Kamel
 Farouk Hanafi
 Rowaida Adnan

References

20th-century Egyptian films
1970 films
Films directed by Ahmed Diaa Eddine